"Some Girls" is the title track of the English rock and roll band the Rolling Stones' 1978 album Some Girls. It marked the third time a song on one of the band's albums also served as the album's title.

Like "Under My Thumb", "Brown Sugar", and "Star Star", the lyrics to "Some Girls" created controversy because of the way it depicted women. The line  "black girls just want to get fucked all night" enraged civil rights activists. In its review of the album, Rolling Stone writer Paul Nelson called it "...a sexist and racist horror..." but added "...it's also terrifically funny and strangely desperate in a manner that gets under your skin and makes you care."

Civil rights leader Jesse Jackson met with Ahmet Ertegun, chair of the board of Atlantic Records (the record's distributor). The record company refused to edit the song for future releases and the band issued a statement saying the lyrics actually mocked stereotypical feelings towards women.

Humorously, Saturday Night Live cast member Garrett Morris commented on the controversy with a mock-editorial on the show's Weekend Update segment: After giving the impression that he was going to openly criticize the Stones, he quoted a sanitized version of the "Black girls just..." line, then stated, "Now, Mr. Jagger, there is only one question I want to ask you – Jaggs. And you better have the answer, man, you better have the answer, since you have besmirched the character of black women. Therefore, here is my question, Jaggs. Where are all of these black broads, man? Hey, like, where ARE they, baby? You got any phone numbers for me, baby? Please send 'em to me. Thank you."

When the Stones performed the song in Martin Scorsese's 2008 movie Shine a Light, however, the line was not included.

See also
Race (human categorization)

References

The Rolling Stones songs
1978 songs
Songs written by Jagger–Richards
Song recordings produced by Jagger–Richards
Race-related controversies in music